Paul Henry  was a Belgian footballer, born 6 September 1912 in Namur (Belgium), died 6 October 1989. Trained at his hometown club, Namur Sports, he played as a midfielder for Daring de Bruxelles and Belgium.

Honours 
 International from 1936 to 1940 (9 caps)
 Picked for the 1938 World Cup (did not play)
 Belgian Champion in 1936 and 1937 with DC Bruxelles
 Vice-Champion of Belgium in 1938 with DC Bruxelles

References 

Belgium international footballers
Belgian footballers
Footballers from Namur (province)
1938 FIFA World Cup players
1912 births
1989 deaths
Association football midfielders
Sportspeople from Namur (city)